Cristan Lee Judd (born 1968-1970) is an Filipino American actor, dancer, and choreographer known for his brief marriage to Jennifer Lopez.

Dance career

At the age of 21, Judd became interested in dance. Within a year, he switched jobs and began dancing professionally with Disney. He was hired to dance with Michael Jackson for the 1995 MTV Video Music Awards and then danced with Jackson on the  HIStory Tour, eventually becoming lead dancer for the tour. In 1999, he performed at the Billboard Music Awards with Celine Dion, the MTV Music Awards with N'SYNC, and in 2000 at the American Music Awards with Enrique Iglesias and Brian McKnight, and for "Best Song" nominee That Thing You Do at the 69th Annual Academy Awards. Judd teamed up for the first time with choreographer Eddie Garcia, a collaboration that continues to this day, to choreograph the 2000 Tour for Jordan Knight.

Judd choreographed numerous music videos including My Way for Usher, Jump, Jive, & Wail for the Brian Setzer Orchestra, If I Could Go for Angie Martinez, and Tango for Julio Iglesias. He also directed the music video, Ain't It Funny-Remix, with Ja Rule. Judd then became creative director for Handprint Entertainment, overseeing a $5 million budget and delivering Jennifer Lopez's NBC concert special Let's Get Loud (DVD), which was filmed at the Roberto Clemente Coliseum in San Juan, Puerto Rico.

Judd appeared as a back-up dancer for his ex-wife in Jennifer Lopez's music videos Love Don't Cost a Thing, Play, and I'm Real, and appeared in her I'm Gonna Be Alright video. Garcia and he produced an interactive dance DVD released in summer 2005, and he has also prepared the Midnight Fantasy musical for the Luxor Resort in Las Vegas.

In 2009, Judd took part in the 2009 MTV Video Music Awards opening dance tribute to former mentor Michael Jackson. Judd took part in the dance performance of "Scream", the duet number between Michael and Michael's sister Janet Jackson; Janet danced alongside Judd and other famous dance choreographers.

Acting
Judd guest-starred on Unfabulous, Eve, Half & Half, Everybody Loves Raymond, Bringing Down the House, and Goyband.

Reality television

Judd's television debut was on the first season of the American series of I'm a Celebrity...Get Me Out of Here! He beat out all the other contestants, earning $200,000 for the Make-a-Wish Foundation when he was crowned "King of the Jungle" in a viewer vote.

In 2006, Judd hosted the reality version of Dirty Dancing, and in 2008 was a judge on Lifetime's Your Mama Don't Dance.

In 2008, Judd appeared in Keeping Up with the Kardashians for season two, episode four titled "Kris the Cheerleader". Kris Jenner was invited to try out to be a cheerleader for a 40+ group who performed during halftime shows. After Jenner's tryout, the team asked her to practice the routine. Jenner then called her "secret weapon", Judd. Judd then worked with Kris Jenner on her moves using his skill set as a choreographer.

In 2009, Judd appeared on the reality TV series Bad Girls Club where he choreographed their opening dance performance for FANTASY, an adult dance revue at the Luxor hotel.

In 2012, he appeared in The Real Housewives of New Jersey, as a choreographer hired by Melissa Gorga.

In 2013, Judd was announced as one of the judges in the third series of New Zealand's Got Talent.

Personal life
Judd met Jennifer Lopez in Spain in late 2000 when he was hired to direct her music video for "Love Don't Cost a Thing". He composed the song, "Alive", which was selected as the theme song for the movie Enough.
The two married on September 29, 2001. The marriage ended over a year later.
Judd married Kelly A. Wolfe in Laguna Beach, California in November 2009. They have a daughter.

References

External links
 

Living people
American choreographers
American male actors
American male actors of Filipino descent
American people of Kapampangan descent
Kapampangan people
I'm a Celebrity...Get Me Out of Here! winners
Participants in American reality television series
Place of birth missing (living people)